Carolyn Cassidy Cudone (September 7, 1918 – March 1, 2009) was an American amateur golfer.

Early life
Cudone was raised in Staten Island, New York.

Career
Cudone is best known for her performance as a seniors' golfer. Among her amateur career successes was her 1958 victory at the North and South Women's Amateur. She was a member of the on the 1956 U.S. Curtis Cup team and in 1970 was team captain. However, it was at the U.S. Senior Women's Amateur where she enjoyed her most noted success. Of the ten Championships she participated in, Cudone won a record five straight titles between 1968 and 1972, the most wins in a row in any USGA championship.

Cudone was a member of the Dunes Golf and Beach Club.

Honors
The Carolyn Cudone Intercollegiate Championship is named in her honor. She was inducted into the South Carolina Golf Hall of Fame in 1979. She was inducted into the Staten Island Sports Hall of Fame in 2000, and finally she was inducted into the Myrtle Beach Golf Hall of Fame in 2009.

Tournament wins
New Jersey State Women's Golf Championship: 1955, 1956, 1959, 1960, 1963, 1965
New Jersey stroke-play: 11-time winner
North and South Women's Amateur: 1958
Women's Metropolitan Amateur: 1955, 1961, 1963, 1964, 1965
U.S. Senior Women's Amateur: 1968, 1969, 1970, 1971, 1972

Team appearances
Amateur
Curtis Cup (representing the United States): 1956, 1970 (non-playing captain, winners)

See also
 List of female golfers
 List of American Curtis Cup golfers

References

External links
USGA obituary

American female golfers
Amateur golfers
Golfers from New York (state)
Golfers from South Carolina
Sportspeople from Staten Island
People from Myrtle Beach, South Carolina
1918 births
2009 deaths
20th-century American women
21st-century American women